The Naval Infantry are an armed branch of the Vietnam People's Navy that have the task of stationing troops to protect islands and rocks, or attacking or landing by sea on the mainland or on the islands occupied by foreign countries, protecting Vietnam's territorial sovereignty and territorial sea.

According to the International Institute of Strategic Studies in 2010, the VPN NI is the second largest marine corp next to the US Marine Corps.

History

Cambodian–Vietnamese War 
In the evening of January 6, a group of commandos of 87 people secretly landed and attacked to occupy a Khmer Rouge artillery position protecting the coast, at the same time, 130 mm artillery began to bombard Khmer Rouge positions. Immediately, small patrol boats of the Khmer Rouge departed from Ream military port and small harbors to attack the Vietnam People's Navy. After a battle at sea, due to its superiority in numbers and firepower, the Vietnam People's Navy repelled or sank most of the Khmer Rouge ships, but one Vietnamese ship was also hit. Many sailors were injured.

Training 
 
Every year, the naval infantry brigades send many waves of soldiers to the island, mainly Spratly Island, to train for months to get used to the waves, to get used to the island and close to the battlefield. Each trip is the most elite members when they have been trained together with the forces and passed the final medical examination.

Current mission 

The situation is becoming more and more complicated when China makes a claim to all the islands and archipelagoes including the Spratly and Paracel archipelagos (under Vietnam's sovereignty) in the entire South China Sea. On May 6, 2009, China submitted a map of the nine-dash line (also known as the U-shaped line) to the United Nations Secretary-General, in which it claimed sovereignty over the entire South China Sea. Soon after, on May 7, 2009, Vietnam, Malaysia and then Indonesia protested and denied.

Current force 
Two Brigades 101 and 147 today are the core force performing the task of defending the islands in the vast waters of the Vietnamese homeland.

 101st Naval Infantry Brigade in Vietnam People's Navy Region 4 Command.
 147th Naval Infantry Brigade belongs to Vietnam People's Navy Region 1 Command, established in 1978.

Current equipment

Reference 

Vietnam People's Navy
Marines